"Busy Man" is a song written by Bob Regan and George Teren, and recorded by American country music artist Billy Ray Cyrus.  It was released in August 1998 as the second single from his album Shot Full of Love.  The song reached a peak of number 3 on the U.S. country singles charts in early 1999, becoming his first Top 10 hit since "Somebody New" in 1993 and his last until "Ready, Set, Don't Go" in 2008.

Content
"Busy Man" is a mid-tempo centralizing on a man who leads a busy life, not taking the time to play with his son, buy lemonade from his daughter, or meet up with his wife's plans as he is a "busy man" and needs to tend to his job instead. In the final verse, however, he changes his mind and cancels his work plans to spend the weekend with his children and wife.

Critical reception
Deborah Evans Price, of Billboard magazine reviewed the song favorably, calling it a "lyric most everyone will relate to." She goes on to say that the production has an "easy, rootsy feel that works well with Cyrus' vocal performance. He sounds more self-assured and in control - the marks of an artist who has suffered the slings and arrows of countless critics and emerged with his artistic vision stronger and more focused despite the abuse." In 2002, Shelly Fabian of About.com ranked the song number 392 on her list of the Top 500 Country Music Songs.

Chart performance
"Busy Man" debuted at number 68 on the U.S. Billboard Hot Country Singles & Tracks chart for the chart week of October 31, 1998. It entered the Top 40 of the charts at number 40 in its fifth chart week. The single spent 27 weeks on the chart, reaching number 3 on March 13, 1999; Cyrus' first Top 5 since "In the Heart of a Woman" also reached number 3 in 1993.

Year-end charts

References

External links
Lyrics at CMT.com

1998 singles
1998 songs
Billy Ray Cyrus songs
Songs written by Bob Regan
Songs written by George Teren
Song recordings produced by Keith Stegall
Mercury Records singles